Eutropis greeri is a species of skink, a lizard in the family Scincidae. The species is endemic to Sri Lanka.

Etymology
The specific name, greeri, is in honor of Australian herpetologist Allen E. Greer.

Geographic range
E. greeri is found in Galle District, Southern Province, Sri Lanka.

Habitat

Behavior
E. greeri is terrestrial, living in the leaf litter of the rainforest.

Reproduction
The mode of reproduction of E. greeri is unknown.

References

Further reading
 Batuwita S (2016). "Description of Two New Species of Eutropis (Reptilia: Scincidae) from Sri Lanka with a Redescription of Eutropis madaraszi (Méhely)". Journal of Herpetology 50 (3): 486–496. (Eutropis greeri, new species).

Eutropis
Reptiles described in 2016
Reptiles of Sri Lanka
Endemic fauna of Sri Lanka
Taxa named by Sudesh Batuwita